Coordinated Video Timings (CVT; VESA-2013-3 v1.2) is a standard by VESA which defines the timings of the component video signal. Initially intended for use by computer monitors and video cards, the standard made its way into consumer televisions.

The parameters defined by standard include horizontal blanking and vertical blanking intervals,  horizontal frequency and vertical frequency (collectively, pixel clock rate or video signal bandwidth), and horizontal/vertical sync polarity.

The standard was adopted in 2002 and superseded the Generalized Timing Formula.

Reduced blanking
CVT timings include the necessary pauses in picture data (known as "blanking intervals") to allow CRT displays to reposition their electron beam at the end of each horizontal scan line, as well as the vertical repositioning necessary at the end of each frame.  CVT also specifies a mode ("CVT-R") which significantly reduces these blanking intervals (to a period insufficient for CRT displays to work correctly) in the interests of saving video signal bandwidth when modern displays such as LCD monitors are being used, since such displays typically do not require these pauses in the picture data.

In revision 1.2, released in 2013, a new "Reduced Blanking Timing Version 2" mode was added which further reduces the horizontal blanking interval from 160 to 80 pixels, increases pixel clock precision from ±0.25 MHz to ±0.001 MHz, and adds the option for a 1000/1001 modifier for ATSC/NTSC video-optimized timing modes (e.g. 59.94 Hz instead of 60.00 Hz or 23.976 Hz instead of 24.000). CEA-861-H will introduce RBv3.

Bandwidth

See also 
 Extended display identification data

References

External links
 VESA free standards - includes free CVT 1.2 timings spreadsheet

Video signal
Audiovisual introductions in 2002